Puerto Rico will compete at the 2014 Summer Youth Olympics, in Nanjing, China from 16 August to 28 August 2014.

Athletics

Puerto Rico qualified six athletes.

Qualification Legend: Q=Final A (medal); qB=Final B (non-medal); qC=Final C (non-medal); qD=Final D (non-medal); qE=Final E (non-medal)

Boys
Track & road events

Field Events

Girls
Track & road events

Basketball

Puerto Rico qualified a boys' team based on the 1 June 2014 FIBA 3x3 National Federation Rankings.

Skills Competition

Boys' Tournament

Roster
 Luis Gonzalez Parrilla
 Antonio Ralat Troncoso
 Albert Roque Baez
 Pedro Villaman Pastrano

Group Stage

Knockout Stage

Beach Volleyball

Puerto Rico qualified a boys' and girls' team by their performance at the NORCECA Final YOG Qualifier.

Fencing

Puerto Rico qualified one athlete based on its performance at the 2014 FIE Cadet World Championships

Girls

Mixed Team

Gymnastics

Artistic Gymnastics

Puerto Rico qualified two athletes based on its performance at the 2014 Junior Pan American Artistic Gymnastics Championships.

Boys

Girls

Judo

Puerto Rico qualified two athletes based on its performance at the 2013 Cadet World Judo Championships.

Individual

Team

Sailing

Puerto Rico was given a reallocation boat based on being a top ranked nation not yet qualified.

Swimming

Puerto Rico qualified one swimmer.

Boys

Table Tennis

Puerto Rico qualified one athlete based on its performance at the Latin American Qualification Event.

Singles

Team

Qualification Legend: Q=Main Bracket (medal); qB=Consolation Bracket (non-medal)

Taekwondo

Puerto Rico qualified one athlete based on its performance at the Taekwondo Qualification Tournament.

Girls

References

2014 in Puerto Rican sports
Nations at the 2014 Summer Youth Olympics
Puerto Rico at the Youth Olympics